Arrested Development is an American television sitcom that originally aired on the Fox network from November 2, 2003, to February 10, 2006.  Created by Mitchell Hurwitz, the show centers on the Bluth family, a formerly wealthy, habitually dysfunctional family, and is presented in a continuous format, incorporating hand-held camera work, narration, archival photos, and historical footage.  The series stars Jason Bateman, Portia de Rossi, Will Arnett, Michael Cera, Alia Shawkat, Tony Hale, David Cross, Jeffrey Tambor, and Jessica Walter. Ron Howard serves as an executive producer on the show, as well as its narrator. 

The first season consists of 22 episodes, which premiered on November 2, 2003, and concluded on June 6, 2004.  Fox picked up a full 22-episode second season, which premiered on November 7, 2004, but its production order was later cut down to 18 episodes.  The second season concluded on April 17, 2005.  The show's third season premiered on September 19, 2005, and was also originally slated for 22 episodes, but the production order was later cut down to 13.  The final four episodes of the series' original run were shown in one two-hour block on February 10, 2006, against NBC's coverage of the 2006 Winter Olympics opening ceremony. A total of 53 episodes of Arrested Development were produced over its original three seasons.

Since its debut, the series has won a variety of different awards including six Primetime Emmy Awards (including Outstanding Comedy Series in 2004), three Television Critics Association Awards, a Golden Globe Award, and a Writers Guild of America Award. Despite widespread approval from critics, Arrested Development never gained a sizable audience and was canceled by Fox in 2006.

In November 2011, however, it was announced that Netflix would license a new season.  The fourth season of Arrested Development began filming in August 2012 and debuted on Netflix's streaming video service on May 26, 2013. Netflix announced on May 17, 2017, that it officially renewed the series for a fifth season, which consists of 16 episodes split into two eight-episode parts; the first half premiered on May 29, 2018, and the second half on March 15, 2019.

Series overview

Episodes

Season 1 (2003–04) 

The first season of Arrested Development consists of 22 episodes, which are listed below as ordered on the DVD collection and not in their original broadcast/production order.

Season 2 (2004–05) 

The second season of Arrested Development consists of 18 episodes, which are listed below as ordered on the DVD collection and not in their original production order.

Season 3 (2005–06) 

The third season of Arrested Development consists of 13 episodes, which are listed below as ordered on the DVD collection and not in their original production order.

Season 4 (2013) 

Six years after the show had been canceled by Fox, filming for a revived fourth season began on August 7, 2012. The season consists of 15 new episodes, which debuted at the same time on Netflix on May 26, 2013 in North and South America, UK, Ireland, and the Nordics. A 22-episode recut titled Arrested Development Season 4 Remix: Fateful Consequences was released on May 3, 2018.

Season 5 (2018–19)

References

External links 
 
 

 
Arrested Development